Livestock is the first album by Australian rock band Fraternity, released in 1971. Livestock is a largely progressive and psychedelic album, and was originally released on the Sweet Peach label, one of only ten albums ever released on it. Livestock was re-released for the first time on CD in 1998 with an alternative cover and three bonus tracks.

Track listing
"Livestock" (Mick Jurd, John Bisset) – 3:39
"Summerville" (Bruce Howe, Sam See) – 4:22
"Raglan's Folly" (M. Jurd, Bon Scott) – 6:02
"Cool Spot" (M. Jurd, Bisset) – 4:53
"Grand Canyon Suites" (M. Jurd) – 4:53
"Jupiter's Landscape" (Howe, See) – 2:47
"You Have a God" (M. Jurd, Carol Jurd) – 2:27
"It" (Jimmy Stewart, Doug Ashdown) – 8:28

1998 CD reissue
"The Race pt. 1" (Stewart, Ashdown) – 2:56 (Non-album single) *
"Seasons of Change" (John Robinson, Neale Johns) – 3:36 (single version) *
"Livestock" – 3:39
"Summerville" – 4:22
"Raglan's Folly" – 6:02
"Cool Spot" – 4:53
"Grand Canyon Suites" – 4:53
"Jupiter's Landscape" – 2:47
"You Have a God" – 2:27
"It" – 8:28
"The Race pt. 2" (Stewart, Ashdown) – 4:12 (B-side of track 1) *

(*) indicates bonus tracks.

Charts

Personnel
Bon Scott – lead vocals, recorder
Mick Jurd – lead guitar
Bruce Howe – bass guitar
John Bisset – keyboards
John Freeman – drums
"Uncle" John Eyers – harmonica on tracks 1 & 11 of the 1998 CD reissue

References

1971 debut albums
Fraternity (band) albums